Cheikh Anta Diop (29 December 1923 – 7 February 1986) was a Senegalese historian, anthropologist, physicist, and politician who studied the human race's origins and pre-colonial African culture. Diop's work is considered foundational to the theory of Afrocentricity, though he himself never described himself as an Afrocentrist. The questions he posed about cultural bias in scientific research contributed greatly to the postcolonial turn in the study of African civilizations.

Diop argued that there was a shared cultural continuity across African people that was more important than the varied development of different ethnic groups shown by differences among languages and cultures over time. Some of his ideas have been criticized as based upon outdated sources and an outdated conception of race. Other scholars have defended his work from what they see as widespread misrepresentation.

Cheikh Anta Diop University (formerly known as the University of Dakar), in Dakar, Senegal, is named after him.

Early life

Born in Thieytou, Diourbel Region, Senegal, Diop belonged to an aristocratic Muslim Wolof family in Senegal where he was educated in a traditional Islamic school. Diop's family was part of the Mouride brotherhood, the only independent Muslim fraternity in Africa according to Diop. He obtained the colonial equivalent of the metropolitan French baccalauréat in Senegal before moving to Paris to study for a degree.

Studies in Paris
In 1946, at the age of 23, Diop went to Paris to study. He initially enrolled to study higher mathematics, but then enrolled to study philosophy  in the Faculty of Arts of the University of Paris. He gained his first degree (licence) in philosophy in 1948, then enrolled in the Faculty of Sciences, receiving two diplomas in chemistry in 1950.

In 1948 Diop edited with Madeleine Rousseau, a professor of art history, a special edition of the journal Musée vivant, published by the Association populaire des amis des musées (APAM). APAM had been set up in 1936 by people on the political left wing to bring culture to wider audiences. The special edition of the journal was on the occasion of the centenary of the abolition of slavery in the French colonies and aimed to present an overview of issues in contemporary African culture and society. Diop contributed an article to the journal: "Quand pourra-t-on parler d'une renaissance africaine" (When we will be able to speak of an African Renaissance?). He examined various fields of artistic creation, with a discussion of African languages, which, he said, would be the sources of regeneration in African culture. He proposed that African culture should be rebuilt on the basis of ancient Egypt, in the same way that European culture was built upon the legacies of ancient Greece and Rome.

In 1949, Diop registered a proposed title for a Doctor of Letters thesis, "The Cultural Future of African thought," under the direction of Professor Gaston Bachelard . In 1951 he registered a second thesis title "Who were the pre-dynastic Egyptians" under Professor Marcel Griaule.

In 1953, he first met Frédéric Joliot-Curie, Marie Curie's son-in-law , and in 1957 Diop began specializing in nuclear physics  at the Laboratory of Nuclear Chemistry of the College de France which Frederic Joliot-Curie ran until his death in 1958 , and the Institut Pierre et Marie Curie in Paris. He ultimately translated parts of Einstein's Theory of Relativity into his native Wolof.

According to Diop's own account, his education in Paris included History, Egyptology, Physics, Linguistics, Anthropology, Economics, and Sociology. In Paris, Diop studied under André Aymard , professor of History and later Dean of the Faculty of Letters at the University of Paris and he said that he had "gained an understanding of the Greco-Latin world as a student of Gaston Bachelard, Frédéric Joliot-Curie, André Leroi-Gourhan, and others".

In his 1954 thesis, Diop argued that ancient Egypt had been populated by Black people. He specified that he used the terms "negro", "black", "white" and "race" as "immediate givens" in the Bergsonian sense, and went on to suggest operational definitions of these terms. He said that the Egyptian language and culture had later been spread to West Africa. When he published many of his ideas as the book Nations nègres et culture (Negro Nations and Culture), it made him one of the most controversial historians of his time.

In 1956 he re-registered a new proposed thesis for Doctor of Letters with the title "The areas of matriarchy and patriarchy in ancient times." From 1956, he taught physics and chemistry in two Paris lycees as an assistant master, before moving to the College de France. In 1957 he registered his new thesis title "Comparative study of political and social systems of Europe and Africa, from Antiquity to the formation of modern states." The new topics did not relate to ancient Egypt but were concerned with the forms of organisation of African and European societies and how they evolved. He obtained his doctorate in 1960.

Career 
Diop served as a member of the UNESCO International Scientific Committee for the Drafting of a General History of Africa in 1971 and wrote the opening chapter about the origins of the ancient Egyptians in the UNESCO General History of Africa. In this chapter, he presented anthropological and historical evidence in support of his hypothesis that Ancient Egyptians had a close genetic affinity with Sub-Saharan African ethnic groups, including a shared B blood group between modern Egyptians and West Africans, "negroid" bodily proportions in ancient Egyptian art and mummies, microscopic analysis of melanin levels in mummies from the laboratory of the Musée de L’Homme in Paris, primary accounts of Greek historians, and shared cultural linkages between Egypt and Africa in areas of totemism and cosmology. At the symposium Diop's conclusions were met with an array of responses, from strong objections to enthusiastic support.

Reception
Diop's work has been both extensively praised and extensively criticized by a variety of scholars.

Positive reception
African-American historian John Henrik Clarke called Diop “one of the greatest historians to emerge in the African world in the twentieth century”, noting that his theoretical approach derived from various disciplines, including the “hard sciences". Clarke further added that his work, The African Origin of Civilization: Myth or Reality, challenged contemporary attitudes “about the place of African people in scholarly circles around the world” and relied upon “historical, archaeological and anthropological evidence to support his thesis”. He later summarised that Diop contributed to a new “concept of African history” among African and African-American historians.

S.O.Y. Keita (né J.D. Walker), a biological anthropologist, contended that "his views, or some of them, have been seriously misrepresented" and he argued that there was linguistic, anthropological and archaeological evidence which supported the views of Diop. The author also stated "Diop, though he did not express it clearly, thought in terms of biogeography and biohistory for his definitions. He also defined populations in an ethnic or ethnogeographical fashion. Nile Valley populations absorbed "foreign genes", but this did not change their Africanity".

Stuart Tyson Smith, Egyptologist and professor of anthropology at University of California, Santa Barbara regarded his work, The African Origin of Civilization, published in 1974 as "A highly influential work that rightly points out the African origins of Egyptian civilization, but reinforces the methodological and theoretical foundations of colonialist theories of history, embracing racialist thinking and simply reversing the flow of diffusionist models".

Guyanese educator and novelist Oscar Dathrone credits Diop as a "unique unifier" in countering the "built-in prejudices of the scholars of his time" and presenting a more comprehensive view of African historical development.

Bethwell Allan Ogot, a Kenyan historian and editor of UNESCO General History of Africa Volume 5, stated that “Cheikh Anta Diop wrested Egyptian civilization from the Egyptologists and restored it to the mainstream of African history”.

Esperanza Brizuela Garcia, professor of history, wrote that he “was most persuasive among intellectuals of African descent in the diaspora” and among Afrocentric scholars who had criticised the omission of Africa in the works of world historians. Garcia also added that his work, The African Origin of Civilization, best represented "Afrocentric critique" but "it does so without a serious engagement with the diversity and complexity of the African experience and offers only a limited challenge to the Eurocentric values it aims to dislodge".

Toyin Falola, a Nigerian historian, called Diop's work "passionate, combative, and revisionist" and "demonstrated the black origins of Egyptian civilisation" in his view.

Firinne Ni Chreachain, an academic in African literature, described him as "one of the most profoundly revolutionary thinkers francophone Africa had produced" in the twentieth century and his radio-carbon techniques had “enabled him to prove, on the contrary to the claims of European Egyptologists, many of the ruling class of ancient Egypt whose achievements Europeans revered had been black Africans”.

Helen Tilley, Associate professor of history at Northwestern University, noted that the academic debates over "The African Origin of Civilizations" still continued but that the "more general points that Cheikh Anta Diop" sought to establish "have become commonplace" and "no one should assume a pure lineage" can be attributed to "any intellectual genealogy because entanglements, appropriations, mutations and dislocations have been the norm, not the exception".

Dawne Y. Curry, Associate Professor of History and Ethnic Studies stated that "Diop's greatest contribution to scholarly endeavours lies in his tireless search for physiological and genetic evidence to support his thesis. Using mummies, bone measurements and blood types to determine age and evolution, Diop revolutionized scientific enquiry" but she noted that his message was not initially well-received but "more and more scholarship [had] began to support Diop's conclusions, earning him international acclaim".

Josep Cervello Autuori, Associate Professor and Lecturer of Egyptology assessed the cultural tradition established by Diop and noted that "the West had failed to consider its contributions, sometimes ignoring them completely, and sometimes considering them as the fruits of the socio-political excitement in the era of African independence". Autuori argued that the academic contributions of Diop should be recognised as "a recontextualisation and a rethinking of the Pharaonic civilisation from an African perspective" due to the continued parallels between Egypt and Africa.

Diop was awarded the joint prize of most influential African intellectual along with W.E.B. Du Bois at the first World Festival of Black Arts in 1966. He was awarded the Grand prix de la mémoire of the GPLA 2015. The Cheikh Anta Diop University (formerly known as the University of Dakar), in Dakar, Senegal, is named in his honor.

Negative reception

According to Andrew Francis Clark, Associate Professor of History at the University of North Carolina-Wilmington and Lucie Colvin Phillips, Professor of African Studies in the University of Maryland, "although Diop's work has been influential, it has generally been discredited by historians".

Robert O. Collins, a former history professor at University of California, Santa Barbara, and James M. Burns, a professor in history at Clemson University, have both characterized Diop's writings on Ancient Egypt as "revisionist".

Diop's book Civilization or Barbarism was described as Afrocentric pseudohistory by professor of philosophy and author Robert Todd Carroll. According to Marnie Hughes-Warrington, Diop's works were criticised by leading French Africanists who opposed the radical movements of Afrikan organizations against imperialism, but they (and later critics) noted the value of his works for the generation of a propaganda program that would promote African unity. Likewise, Santiago Juan-Navarro, a professor of Spanish at Florida International University described Diop as having "undertaken the task of supporting this Afrocentric view of history from an equally radical and 'mythic' point of view".

Historian Robin Derricourt, in summarizing Diop's legacy, states that his work "increased francophone black pride, though trapped within dated models of racial classification". Stephen Howe, professor of the history of colonialism in Bristol University, writes that Diop's work is built mostly upon disagreements with Victorian-era thinkers like J.J. Bachofen, Lewis Henry Morgan and Friedrich Engels, and criticizes him for "failing to take modern research into account."

Kevin MacDonald, a doctor of archeology, was critical of what he saw as Diop's "cavalier attitude" in making "amateur, non-statistical comparison of languages" between West Africa and Egypt. MacDonald also felt that such attitude showed "a disrespect for the discipline" and for the "methodology of linguistics". He did however state that Diop had asked "appropriate and relevant questions" regarding possible relations between Egypt and the African continent beyond Nubia.

Historian Clarence E. Walker criticizes Diop's claim that Ramses II was black, as being without qualification, a futile exercise and "probably the single most unsuccessful effort on the part of a scholar to determine the racial origins of an Egyptian notable".

Mary Lefkowitz, scholar of Classics, accuses Diop of supplying his readers only with selected and, to some extent, distorted information. She criticizes his methodology, stating that his writing allows him to disregard historical evidence, especially if it comes from European sources.

Historian and classicist Frank M. Snowden Jr. states that Diop misinterprets the classical usage of color words, distorts classical sources and omits Greek and Roman authors, whom he claimed, make a clear distinction between Egyptians and Ethiopians.

Publications 
 Rousseau, Madeleine and Cheikh Anta Diop (1948), "1848 Abolition de l'esclavage – 1948 evidence de la culture nègre", Le musée vivant, issue 36–37. Special issue of journal "consacré aux problèmes culturels de l'Afrique noire a été établi par Madeleine Rousseaux et Cheikh Anta Diop". Paris: APAM, 1948.
 (1954) Nations nègres et culture, Paris: Éditions Africaines. Second edition (1955), Nations nègres et culture: de l'antiquité nègre-égyptienne aux problèmes culturels de l'Afrique noire d'aujourd'hui, Paris: Éditions Africaines. Third edition (1973), Paris: Présence Africaine, . Fourth edition (1979), .
 (1959) L'unité culturelle de l'Afrique noire: domaines du patriarcat et du matriarcat dans l'antiquité classique, Paris: Présence Africaine. Second edition (c. 1982), Paris: Présence Africaine, . English edition (1959), The Cultural Unity of Negro Africa Paris. Subsequent English edition (c. 1962), Paris: Présence Africaine. English edition (1978), The Cultural Unity of Black Africa: the domains of patriarchy and of matriarchy in classical antiquity, Chicago: Third World Press, . Subsequent English edition (1989) London: Karnak House, .
 (1960) L' Afrique noire pré-coloniale. Étude comparée des systèmes politiques et sociaux de l'Europe et de l'Afrique noire, de l'antiquité à la formation des états modernes, Paris: Présence africaine. Second edition (1987), . (1987), Precolonial Black Africa: a comparative study of the political and social systems of Europe and Black Africa, from antiquity to the formation of modern states. Translated by Harold J. Salemson. Westport, Conn.: L. Hill, .
 (1960) Les Fondements culturels, techniques et industriels d'un futur état fédéral d'Afrique noire, Paris. Second revised and corrected edition (1974), Les Fondements économiques et culturels d'un état fédéral d'Afrique noire, Paris: Présence Africaine.
 (1967) Antériorité des civilisations nègres: mythe ou vérité historique? Series: Collection Préhistoire-antiquité négro-africaine, Paris: Présence Africaine. Second edition (c. 1993), .
 (1968) Le laboratoire de radiocarbone de l'IFAN. Series: Catalogues et documents, Institut Français d'Afrique Noire No. 21.
 (1974) The African Origin of Civilization: Myth or Reality (translation of sections of Antériorité des civilisations négres and Nations nègres et culture). Translated from the French by Mercer Cook. New York: L. Hill, 
 (1974) Physique nucléaire et chronologie absolue. Dakar: IFAN. Initiations et études Africaines no. 31.
 (1977) Parenté génétique de l'égyptien pharaonique et des langues négro-africaines: processus de sémitisation, Ifan-Dakar: Les Nouvelles Éditions Africaines, .
 (1978) Black Africa: the economic and cultural basis for a federated state. Translation by Harold Salemson of Fondements économiques et culturels d'un état fédéral d'Afrique noire. Westport, Conn.: Lawrence Hill & Co, . New expanded edition (1987)  (Africa World Press), .
 UNESCO Symposium on the Peopling of Ancient Egypt and the Deciphering of Meroitic Script. Cheikh Anta Diop (ed.) (1978), The peopling of ancient Egypt and the deciphering of Meroitic script: proceedings of the symposium held in Cairo from 28 January to 3 February 1974, UNESCO. Subsequent edition (1997), London: Karnak House, .
 (c. 1981) Civilisation ou barbarie: anthropologie sans complaisance, Présence Africaine, . English edition (c. 1991), Civilization or Barbarism: an authentic anthropology Translated from the French by Yaa-Lengi Meema Ngemi, edited by Harold J. Salemson and Marjolijn de Jager. Brooklyn, NY: Lawrence Hill Books, c1991.
 (1989) Nouvelles recherches sur l'égyptien ancien et les langues négro-africaines modernes, Paris: Présence Africaine, .
 (1989) Egypte ancienne et Afrique Noire. Reprint of article in Bulletin de l'IFAN, vol. XXIV, series B, no. 3-4, 1962, pp. 449 à 574. Université de Dakar. Dakar: IFAN.
 (c. 1990) Alerte sous les tropiques: articles 1946–1960: culture et développement en Afrique noire, Paris: Présence africaine, . English edition (1996), Towards the African renaissance: essays in African culture & development, 1946–1960. Translated by Egbuna P. Modum. London: Karnak House, .
 Joseph-Marie Essomba (ed.) (1996), Cheikh Anta Diop: son dernier message à l'Afrique et au monde. Series: Sciences et connaissance. Yaoundé, Cameroun: Editions AMA/COE.
 (2006) Articles: publiés dans le bulletin de l'IFAN, Institut fondamental d'Afrique noire (1962–1977). Series: Nouvelles du sud; no 35-36. Yaoundé: Silex.

Bibliography
Présence Africaine (ed.) (1989), Hommage à Cheikh Anta Diop  – Homage to Cheikh Anta Diop, Paris: Special Présence Africaine, New Bilingual Series N° 149–150.
 Prince Dika-Akwa nya Bonambéla (ed.) (2006), Hommage du Cameroun au professeur Cheikh Anta Diop, Dakar: Panafrika. Dakar: Nouvelles du Sud. , .

References

Further reading
Cheikh Anta Diop (1989), The African Origin of Civilization: Myth Or Reality, Chicago Review Press, 
François-Xavier Fauvelle (1996), L'Afrique de Cheikh Anta Diop: histoire et idéologie, Karthala Editions (in French)

External links

 Cheikh Anta Diop Conference
 Cheikh Anta Diop at Africa Within
 A Brief Biography of an African Champion at Raceandhistory.com
 Summary of Cheikh Anta Diop's Work (in French) at Ankhonline.com
 Université Cheikh Anta Diop de Dakar Cheikh Anta Diop University of Dakar
 Cheikh Anta Diop, The Pharaoh of Knowledge
 Listen to interviews with Cheikh Anta Diop (in French) at Rufisque News

1923 births
1986 deaths
20th-century anthropologists
20th-century historians
20th-century physicists
20th-century male writers
Historians of Africa
People from Diourbel Region
Senegalese Africanists
Senegalese pan-Africanists
National Democratic Rally (Senegal) politicians
Senegalese anthropologists
Senegalese historians
Senegalese physicists
Senegalese politicians
Cheikh Anta Diop University
University of Paris alumni
Senegalese expatriates in France